The Lal Bahadur Shastri Corporation Stadium is a stadium in Kollam. It hosts football matches and it has recently been renovated. The Sports Authority of India is having a training centre in this stadium.

History

The Lal Bahadur Shastri Stadium was established in 1988. The stadium is located at Cantonment area in Kollam city. This is a multi-purpose stadium, suitable for playing cricket, football, rugby 7s and athletics. The matting type of pitch is used in this stadium which is very much suitable for playing cricket.

Renovations

 Construction of a new pavilion of size 44mX20.8m 
 Change room and toilet for players
 Media work station
 VIP rest room
 Repair of Gallery
 Turfing of play area using Mexican grass
 Providing chain link fencing around the play area

Hosted sports and events
The stadium has hosted Ranji Trophy Matches of Kerala in 1979 and 1988. College End and Road End are the end names used during the cricket matches.

The stadium also hosted Santosh Trophy Football Matches during 1965, 1973, 1988 and 2013

See also
 Kollam
 Kollam district
 Kollam Junction railway station

References

External links

 Picture of the stadium

Football venues in Kerala
Multi-purpose stadiums in India
Rugby union stadiums in India
Sports venues in Kollam
Memorials to Lal Bahadur Shastri
1988 establishments in Kerala
Sports venues completed in 1988
20th-century architecture in India